Angermünde is a town in the district of Uckermark in the state of Brandenburg, Germany.

The population is about 14,000, but has been declining since its traditional industrial base, enamel-working, has declined. An administrative sub-centre of its district, it has several Protestant churches, a former Franciscan church, a number of schools of higher learning and a recently refurbished historic marketplace with an old town hall. Located in the game-filled forests of the Uckermark, with its many lakes, it now relies heavily on tourism and the sources of revenue linked to it.

Since 2010, Angermünde is a federally declared resort town.

Name
The name Angermünde is an abbreviation of the older town of Tangermünde, for a while the town was named New-Tangermünde (Neu-Tangermünde), until it was changed to "Angermünde", with Anger being German for a central square in a town.

Geography 
With an area of around 324 km2, Angermünde is Germany's 16th largest municipality. It is located in the Uckermarck region, roughly 80 km north of Berlin. The community is made up of the Inner City (German: Kernstadt) and 23 adjacent districts: Altkünkendorf, Biesenbrow, Bölkendorf, Bruchhagen, Crussow, Dobberzin, Frauenhagen, Gellmersdorf, Görlsdorf, Greiffenberg, Günterberg, Herzsprung, Kerkow, Mürow, Neukünkendorf, Schmargendorf, Schmiedeberg, Steinhöfel, Stolpe, Welsow, Wilmersdorf, Wolletz, and Zuchenberg.

Additionally, there are 40 more registered neighborhoods within the districts (German: Wohnplätze): Altenhof, Augustenfelde, Ausbau, Ausbau Mürower Straße, Ausbau Pinnower Weg, Ausbau Welsower Weg, Bauernsee, Blumberger Mühle, Breitenteicher Mühle, Friedrichsfelde, Gehegemühle, Glambecker Mühle, Greiffenberg Siedlung, Grumsin, Henriettenhof, Klein Frauenhagen, Leistenhof, Leopoldsthal, Linde, Lindenhof, Louisenhof, Luisenthal, Mürow-Oberdorf, Neu-Günterberg, Neuhaus, Neuhof, Peetzig, Rosinthal, Schäferei, Sonnenhof, Sternfelde, Stolper Mühle, Thekenberg, Waldfried, Waldfrieden, Wilhelmsfelde, Wilhelmshof, Ziethenmühle und Zollende.

History
The town was the site of a 1420 victory of Frederick I of Brandenburg over the Pomeranians.

In the 19th century, the town was the seat of a Prussian circle in the province of Brandenburg and linked to Berlin by the Berlin–Stettin (now Szczecin, Poland) railway. Angermünde station then served as the junction for branch lines servicing Prenzlau, Bad Freienwalde, and Schwedt.

Demography

Mayors
 1989–1998: Wolf-Hugo Just
 1998–2016: Wolfgang Krakow (SPD)
 since 2016: Frederik Bewer (independent)

Frederik Bewer was elected in May 2016 with 95.3% of the vote, for an eight-year term.

Gallery

Sons and daughters of the town

 Friedrich Heinrich von der Hagen (1780–1856), German scholar
 Albert Manthe (1847–1928), sculptor
 Hermann Dietrich (1856–1930), born in Schmargendorf, politician (DNVP), member of Reichstag 
 Ehm Welk (1884–1966), writer
 Hans-Erich Voss (1897–1969), Vice Admiral in World War II
 Günter Reimann (1904–2005), economist and journalist
 Heinrich Borgmann (1912–1945), adjutant of Adolf Hitler
 Hartmut Losch (1943–1997), athlete, European champion in discus throw
 Maik Heydeck (born 1965), boxer
 Julia Jäger (born 1970), actress

Twin cities 

 Espelkamp, North Rine-Westphalia 
 Lüdge, North Rine-Westphalia 
 Strzelce Krajeńskie, Lubusz Voivodeship, Poland
 Zurrieq, Malta

Notes

References

External links

 Official Website 

Localities in Uckermark (district)